Overcast Coffee Company is a coffee shop with two locations in Seattle, in the U.S. state of Washington.

Description 
Overcast Coffee Company has two locations on Seattle's Capitol Hill. In addition to coffee and tea drinks such as Americanos and masala chais, the business has served pastries, beer, and wine. The coffee shop on Union Street features an exterior mural by Stevie Shao.

History 
Jonathan Pak opened the first shop in the Kaiser Permanente building on 15th Avenue in June 2020. In 2021, a second location opened on Union Street, sharing space with the Métier bike shop (also known as Metier Racing and Coffee). The second location is known as the Overcast Coffee Bar.

Reception 
Mark Van Streefkerk and Gabe Guarente included the business in Eater Seattle's November 2021 overview of "the hottest coffee shops to check out". Zuri Anderson ranked Overcast first in iHeart's 2022 overview of Seattle's best coffee shops, based on Yelp reviews.

References

External links 

 

Capitol Hill, Seattle
Coffeehouses and cafés in Washington (state)
Restaurants in Seattle